In common law legal systems, black letter laws are the well-established legal rules that are no longer subject to reasonable dispute. Some examples are the hyphenated "black-letter law" that the formation of a contract requires consideration, or the "black-letter law" that the registration of a trademark requires established use in the course of trade. Black-letter law can be contrasted with legal theory or unsettled legal issues.

History and etymology
In an 1831 case in the U.S. Supreme Court, Jackson ex dem. Bradstreet v. Huntington, the phrase "black letter" was used: "It is seldom that a case in our time savours so much of the black letter; but the course of decisions in New York renders it unavoidable...". The phrase "black-letter law" was used in the Pennsylvania Supreme Court case Naglee v. Ingersoll, 7 Pa. 185 (1847). The phrase does not come from association with Black's Law Dictionary, which was first published in 1891. Instead, it presumably refers to the practice of setting law books and citing legal precedents in blackletter type, a tradition that survived long after the switch to Roman and italic text for other printed works.

The phrase definitely refers to a distillation of the common law into general and accepted legal principles. This can be seen in the quote above from the Supreme Court where the court is noting that while the black letter law is clear, New York precedent deviates from the general principles.

In common law, the informal black letter legal doctrine includes the basic principles of law generally accepted by the courts and/or embodied in the statutes of a particular jurisdiction. The letter of the law is its actual implementation, thereby demonstrating that black letter laws are those statutes, rules, acts, laws, provisions, etc. that are or have been written down, codified, or indicated somewhere in legal texts throughout history of specific state law. This is often the case for many precedents that have been set in the common law. An example of such a state within the common law jurisdiction, and using the black letter legal doctrine is Canada. Canada is a monarchical state, with its roots invested in Colonial England, and black letter law is the principles of law accepted by the majority of judges in most provinces and territories. Sometimes this is referred to as "hornbook law" meaning treatise or textbook, often relied upon as authoritative, competent, and generally accepted in the field of Canadian law. In lawyer lingo, hornbook law or black letter law is a fundamental and well-accepted legal principle that does not require any further explanation, since a hornbook is a primer of basics. Law is the rule which establish that a principle, provision, references, inference, observation, etc. may not require further explanation or clarification when the very nature of them shows that they are basic and elementary.

Similar phrases
The phrase is nearly synonymous with the phrase "hornbook law". There are a number of venerable legal sources that distill the common law on various subjects known as Restatement of the Law. The specific titles will be "The Restatement (First) of Contracts" or "The Restatement of Agency" etc. Each of these volumes is divided into sections that begin with a text in boldface that summarizes a basic rule on an aspect of the law of contracts, agency etc. This "restatement" is followed by commentary and examples that expand on the principle stated.

Another synonymous term, usually used in the United Kingdom is "trite law".

References

Informal legal terminology